Pantech Wireless, Inc. (PWI), formed in 2002, is the North American subsidiary of Pantech, one of Korea’s three largest mobile phone manufacturers.

Background
PWI has created wireless products for major North American carriers including AT&T, Verizon Wireless, Sprint Nextel and Virgin Mobile.

Benchmark handsets created by PWI for the North American market include the popular line of dual-sliding, double-keyboard devices such as the Pantech duo, Matrix, and Pantech Matrix Pro smartphone. PWI also manufactures Slate, “world’s thinnest phone with a QWERTY keyboard,” and C3b, “the world’s smallest camera flip-phone.” Additionally, PWI created the Breeze, a handset that utilizes the principles of Universal Design, which are a set of guidelines that ensure consumer electronics products are of optimal ease of use for customers of all ages, and those with disabilities.

Products North America

Pantech Company Timeline
 1991: Established Pantech Co., Ltd
 2002: Established Pantech Wireless, Inc. (PWI) in North America
 2003: Formed a J/V – Dalian Daxian Pantech Communications Co, Ltd in Dalian, China
 2003: Company begins developing Pantech branded products
 2004: Pantech debuts first GSM handset with fingerprint recognition
 2005: Acquired SK Teletech owning SKY brand, the most upscale premium brand in Korea
 2005: First entered Japan market among Korean handset makers delivering 1st model to KDDI
 2006: First PWI branded device, PN-218, offered through Alltell
 2006: PWI launches C300, “world’s smallest camera flip phone,” with AT&T
 2006: PWI manufacturers Ocean, first dual-sliding, double keyboard handset, created for Helio
 2008: Slate, “world’s thinnest phone with a QWERTY keyboard,” created for AT&T
 2009: Launched Breeze, an easy-to-use and “top performing” handset for AT&T
 2009: Launched ‘Matrix Pro’, a dual sliding smart phone for AT&T
 2010: Launched Impact, Pantech's first haptic, dual key-board 3G Quick Messaging phone for AT&T
 2010: Launched Reveal, a slider with simultaneous numeric and QWERTY keypad 3G Quick Messaging phone for AT&T
 2010: Link, Pantech's ultra-slim and sleek messaging phone launches at AT&T
 2010: Launched Breeze II, the successor to the Breeze, easy-to-use handset for AT&T
 2010: Pursuit launches for AT&T as Pantech's first phone with touchscreen
 2010: Launched Pantech Ease, the first simplicity-centric phone for AT&T with keyboard and touchscreen
 2010: Laser, AT&T's thinnest phone with sliding keyboard, is launched
 2011: Crossover, Pantech's first Android smartphone in the U.S., is launched
 2011: 20th Anniversary of Pantech Wireless, Inc., U.S.-based subsidiary of Pantech Group
 2011: Pantech announces exclusive handset sponsorship of Dew Tour
 2011: Pantech announces sponsorship of Dew Tour Pro Athletes, Bucky Lasek, Brett Banasiewicz, Greg Lutzka, Ryan Devenzo
 2011: Inaugural Pantech Open in Ocean City, MD for Dew Tour Action Sports Competition

Awards
 1995: Pantech creates the world’s first CDMA product
 2005: Pantech honored with the Best Mobile Phone Application distinction at the Asian Mobile News Award
 2005, 2006, 2007: Pantech receives seven iF Design awards and four red dot Design awards for excellence and innovation in mobile phone design
 2007: Pantech’s IM-U200 (Korean market) awarded ‘Best of Innovation’ at CES International

References

External links
 
 Pantech Slate C530 (AT&T) – PC Magazine
 Pantech Matrix – TestFreaks
 Pantech Breeze - white (AT&T) – CNET
 Pantech's North American Offensive – BusinessWeek

Mobile phone manufacturers